Rupbas railway station is a railway station in Bharatpur district, Rajasthan. Its code is RBS. It serves Rupbas. The station consists of 2 platforms. Passenger, Express trains halt here.

References

Railway stations in Bharatpur district
Agra railway division